AEConnect (AEC-1) is a submarine communications cable privately owned by Aqua Comms linking the United States and Ireland.  The cable has extended connectivity via the CeltixConnect cable to London.  Originally the cable project was called Emerald Express managed by Emerald Networks, and was intended to include a cable landing in Iceland, however after being unable to secure funding the project ownership was transferred to the current owner.

The cable began construction in April 2015.  The cable spans 5536 km between landing stations in Shirley, USA and Killala, Ireland.    The cable's final splice was made in November 2015 and was declared to be ready for service in January 2016

References

Transatlantic communications cables
Submarine communications cables in the North Atlantic Ocean
Infrastructure completed in 2016
Ireland–United States relations
Coastal construction
Telecommunications equipment
History of telecommunications
2016 establishments in Ireland
2016 establishments in New York (state)